Horin Khalifeh (also Romanized as Horīn Khalīfeh; also known as Hornī Khalīfeh and Khalīfeh) is a village in Kuhdasht-e Shomali Rural District, in the Central District of Kuhdasht County, Lorestan Province, Iran. At the 2006 census, its population was 329, in 81 families.

References 

Towns and villages in Kuhdasht County